Stephen's Sausage Roll is a 2016 puzzle video game developed and published by Increpare Games, the studio of designer Stephen Lavelle. The player controls a character who pushes sausage links onto hot grill tiles to cook them. It was received well by critics and was praised by other prolific indie puzzle video game creators.

Gameplay 

Puzzles in Stephen's Sausage Roll involve moving around sausage links in a Sokoban-like grid format, with the goal being to move each sausage over special grill tiles in order to cook them once on each spot—two spots on each "side" of the sausage—and then return the player character to the starting position.

A puzzle can be failed either by burning a sausage, which happens when a single spot is cooked more than once; rolling a sausage off of the island and into the surrounding water; or making the player character themself fall into the water. The game includes an undo button to go back a single step, as well as a button to restart.

The player character is composed of two parts: the character itself, and their fork, each of which occupy their own tile. The player can rotate in place and move forwards and backwards, but may not strafe while holding the fork, which makes navigation of tight spaces difficult.

The game is split into multiple sections, each of which require all puzzles within to be completed before the player can move on to the next section. These sections introduce new puzzle mechanics as the game progresses, including the ability to skewer sausages onto the fork, roll on top of sausages, and the ability to separate the player character from their fork.

Plot 
The story of Stephen's Sausage Roll is communicated through stone tablets found throughout the game's overworld. They contain short, seemingly-unrelated phrases which gradually grow into a fuller story.

Reception 

Stephen's Sausage Roll holds an aggregated Metacritic score of 90/100, based on 9 critic reviews. Reviewers noted the game's difficulty, where Jordan Erica Webber from The Guardian said the game was more difficult than The Witness, which was already recognized for its difficulty. The Guardian described the game's designer, Stephen Lavelle, as prolific.

Prior to release fellow indie developers Bennett Foddy and Jonathan Blow both praised the game for its difficulty and originality, with Foddy comparing the game to Dark Souls. Jordan Erica Webber from The Guardian noted that the difficulty may frustrate some players.

Accolades

References

External links 
 

2016 video games
Indie video games
Puzzle video games
Video games about food and drink
Video games developed in the United Kingdom
Linux games
MacOS games
Windows games
Single-player video games